David Burton (1877–1963) was a Russian-born American film director of the 1930s. He had previously worked as a theater director.

Selected filmography
 The Bishop Murder Case (1930)
 Free and Easy (1930)
 Strictly Unconventional (1930)
 Fighting Caravans (1931)
 Dancers in the Dark (1932)
 Brief Moment (1933)
 The Romantic Age (1934)
 Princess O'Hara (1935)
 The Melody Lingers On (1935)
 The Man Who Wouldn't Talk (1940)
 Manhattan Heartbeat (1940)

References

Bibliography
 Everett Aaker. George Raft: The Films. McFarland, 2013.

External links

1877 births
1963 deaths
American film directors
Russian film directors
Emigrants from the Russian Empire to the United States
Film people from Odesa